Mamadou Fofana (born 7 January 1988) is a French former footballer who played professionally in Sweden.

Club career
Fofana started his career in the lower divisions of France, before moving to Sweden to sign with Allsvenskan side Syrianska in 2011. He made two appearances for the Södertälje-based side.

After leaving Sweden, Fofana moved to England to join Lincoln City on a short-term deal in August 2012. This deal was then extended in December 2012. After continuing to impress, he signed a one-year deal in May 2013.

In 2014, he signed for Conference North side Oxford City, where he made eighteen appearances. In the summer of 2015, he signed for Barrow, but after failing to break into the first team squad, he was loaned back to Oxford City on a one-month deal in November of the same year. This deal was cut short, and Fofana was recalled after Barrow's squad was depleted by injuries.

In 2018 Fofana left England for Oman, playing for a few months before the club he joined encountered financial problems. He attended a training camp in Thailand in December 2018, before eventually signing with Thai League 3 side Bangkok.

Career statistics

Club

Notes

References

1988 births
Living people
People from Sarcelles
French footballers
Association football midfielders
Championnat National 2 players
Allsvenskan players
National League (English football) players
AS Vitré players
CS Sedan Ardennes players
Olympique Noisy-le-Sec players
La Vitréenne FC players
Syrianska FC players
Lincoln City F.C. players
Oxford City F.C. players
Barrow A.F.C. players
Mamadou Fofana
French expatriate footballers
Expatriate footballers in Sweden
French expatriate sportspeople in Sweden
Expatriate footballers in England
French expatriate sportspeople in England
Expatriate footballers in Oman
French expatriate sportspeople in Oman
Expatriate footballers in Thailand
French expatriate sportspeople in Thailand
Footballers from Val-d'Oise